Danilo Mandic from the Imperial College London, London, UK was named Fellow of the Institute of Electrical and Electronics Engineers (IEEE) in 2013 for contributions to multivariate and nonlinear learning systems.

References

Fellow Members of the IEEE
Living people
Year of birth missing (living people)
Place of birth missing (living people)
Academics of Imperial College London